"Attack of the Ghost Riders" is a single by The Raveonettes released in 2002.

The 1950s-style music video, in which a convict is executed in the electric chair but returns as a Johnny Blaze-type ghost rider, was directed by Peder Pedersen. It got censored on MTV, but can be seen uncut on the director's website. The song is written in B flat minor along with all the other songs in the album.

CD Single track listing
 "Attack of the Ghost Riders" - 2:30
 "Go Girl Go" - 2:58
 "Demons Fire" - 2:32

References

2002 singles
The Raveonettes songs
2002 songs
Black-and-white music videos